Bitter Lake is a lake in South Dakota, in the United States.

Bitter Lake contains unpleasant tasting lake water, hence the name.

See also
List of lakes in South Dakota

References

Lakes of South Dakota
Bodies of water of Miner County, South Dakota